Johnson Roussety, Chief Commissioner of Rodrigues
Joseph Johnson, Jr., New York City Fire Commissioner
Roger Johnson (North Dakota), North Dakota Agriculture Commissioner